The men's hammer throw was one of four men's throwing events on the Athletics at the 1964 Summer Olympics program in Tokyo. It was held on 17 October and 18 October 1964, with the qualification on the first day and the final the next. 25 athletes from 14 nations entered, with 1 not starting in the qualification round. The maximum number of athletes per nation had been set at 3 since the 1930 Olympic Congress. The event was won by Romuald Klim of the Soviet Union, the nation's second consecutive victory in the men's hammer throw. Gyula Zsivótzky of Hungary repeated as silver medalist, the fifth man to win multiple medals in the event. Uwe Beyer took bronze, the first medal for the United Team of Germany and the first medal for any German hammer thrower since 1952.

Background

This was the 14th appearance of the event, which has been held at every Summer Olympics except 1896. Nine of the 15 finalists from the 1960 Games returned: silver medalist Gyula Zsivótzky of Hungary, bronze medalist (and 1956 finalist) Tadeusz Rut of Poland, fourth-place finisher John Lawlor of Ireland, fifth-place finisher Olgierd Ciepły of Poland, eighth-place finisher (and 1956 gold medalist) Hal Connolly of the United States, ninth-place finisher Heinrich Thun of Austria, tenth-place finisher Yuriy Nikulin of the Soviet Union, thirteenth-place finisher Noboru Okamoto of Japan, and fourteenth-place finisher (and 1956 finalist) Albert Hall of the United States. Zsivótzky and Soviet Romuald Klim were favored.

No nations made their debut in the event. The United States appeared for the 14th time, the only nation to have competed at each appearance of the event to that point.

Competition format

The competition used the two-round format introduced in 1936, with the qualifying round completely separate from the divided final. In qualifying, each athlete received three attempts; those recording a mark of at least 63.00 metres advanced to the final. If fewer than 12 athletes achieved that distance, the top 12 would advance. The results of the qualifying round were then ignored. Finalists received three throws each, with the top six competitors receiving an additional three attempts. The best distance among those six throws counted.

Records

Prior to this competition, the existing world and Olympic records were as follows:

Romuald Klim matched the Olympic record of 67.10 metres in his qualifying throw; Hal Connolly bettered it with 67.40 metres in his before Gyula Zsivótzky had the best throw of the round at 67.99 metres to take the record going into the final.

Zsivótzky broke his own record with his first throw in the final, reaching 69.09 metres. That record held until Klim's fourth throw, which went 69.74 metres for a new Olympic record. Uwe Beyer and Yuriy Nikulin also beat the old record, but never held the record as their throws came after better ones by Zsivótzky.

Schedule

All times are Japan Standard Time (UTC+9)

Results

Qualifying

The qualification standard was 63.00 metres. Each thrower had three attempts to reach that standard.

Final

Zsivótzky threw 69.09 in the first throw, beating his own Olympic record from the qualifier. Klim's fourth throw overtook that record and held for the gold medal distance.

References

Athletics at the 1964 Summer Olympics
Hammer throw at the Olympics
Men's events at the 1964 Summer Olympics